Brest Charter was a document signed by the Irish Republican Movement (IRM), Breton Democratic Union (UDB), the Galician People's Union (UPG) and Lucha Occitana (LO)  in February 1972 in Brest, Brittany, France. The Charter confirmed a joint struggle for a Europe of independent socialist states. The Herri Alderdi Sozialista Iraultzailea, Cymru Goch, Socialist Party of National Liberation - provisional, Catalan Workers Left, Su Populu Sardu and Occitan Struggle (LOC) also signed the Charter.

Political charters

1972 documents
Pan-European nationalism
Stateless nationalism in Europe
Secessionist organizations in Europe
Left-wing nationalism
Left-wing internationals
1972 in politics